The Jet d'Eau (Water-Jet) is a large fountain in Geneva, Switzerland  and is one of the city's most famous landmarks, being featured on the city's official tourism web site and on the official logo for Geneva's hosting of group stage matches at UEFA Euro 2008.<ref>Genève Tourisme - Geneva - Genf - Ginevra - Ginebra</refge.ch/_img/documents/pdf/corporate/patrimoine/SIG_Depliant_jet%20d%27eau.pdf SIG Brochure "Jet d'eau", p1 - "La Course des Jets d'eau" ("The water fountain competition")(French)]</ref> Situated where Lake Geneva exits as the Rhône, it is visible throughout the city and from the air, even when flying over Geneva at an altitude of .

Unsuspecting visitors to the fountain—which can be reached via a stone jetty from the left bank of the lake—may be surprised to find themselves drenched after a slight change in wind direction.

History 
The first Jet d'Eau was installed in 1886 at the Usine de la Coulouvrenière, a little further downstream from its present location. In 1891, its aesthetic value was recognised and it was moved to its present location to celebrate the Federal Gymnastics Festival and the 600th anniversary of the Swiss Confederation, when it was operated for the first time. The present Jet d'Eau was installed in 1951 in a partially submerged pumping station to pump lake water instead of city water.

Since 2003, the fountain has operated during the day all year round, except in case of frost or particularly strong wind. It also operates in the evenings between spring and autumn, when it is lit by a set of 21 lights totaling 9 kW.

On 25 August 2016, the fountain celebrated its 125th anniversary at its present location. Between 30 March and 11 June 2020, the jet was shut off while the city was under public health measures due to COVID-19.

The Jet d'Eau featured in the titles and cut scenes of the late 1960s British television series The Champions.

Images

See also 

 Captain James Cook Memorial, similar water jet fountain in Canberra, Australia

Notes

External links

 SIG Genève, the maintainer of the Jet
 Jet d'Eau page at City of Geneva website
 Jet visible on Google Maps

Monuments and memorials in Switzerland
Tourist attractions in Geneva
Fountains in Switzerland
Buildings and structures in Geneva